The 1875 Rutgers Queensmen football team represented Rutgers University in the 1875 college football season. The Queensmen compiled a 1–1–1 record and outscored their opponents 8 to 5. The team had no coach, and its captain was Peter H. Miliken.

Schedule

References

Rutgers
Rutgers Scarlet Knights football seasons
Rutgers Queensmen football